Temple Israel Cemetery may refer to:
Temple Israel Cemetery (Stockton, California), a California Historical Landmark
Temple Israel Cemetery (Wakefield, Massachusetts), listed on the NRHP in Massachusetts
 Temple Israel Cemetery (Omaha, Nebraska)